Nadia Alexander (born April 5, 1994, in Columbia, South Carolina) is an American actress. She has performed in several television series, including The Sinner (2017) and Seven Seconds (2018). She won the award for Best Actress in a U.S. Narrative Film at the 2017 Tribeca Film Festival for her performance in Blame (2017) and was nominated for a Fangoria Chainsaw Award for Best Actress for her performance in The Dark (2019).

Career
Alexander began acting at the age of six, when she was cast in a Pittsburgh-area regional stage production of The Sound of Music as Gretl. She worked professionally throughout her childhood at most of southwestern Pennsylvania's Equity theaters, including Pittsburgh Public Theater, where she won first place in their annual Shakespeare Monologue Competition for three consecutive years.

In 2007, Alexander moved to New York City, and began doing commercial and episodic television work. While still in high school, Alexander performed off-Broadway in There Are No More Big Secrets at Rattlestick Playwrights Theater. Her first feature film performance was in the independent movie Postales. She went on to appear in Ten Thousand Saints and Fan Girl.

In 2010, she made a guest appearance on an episode of Law & Order. Since then, she has worked on several television series, including Boardwalk Empire (2011), The Following (2015), The Sinner (2017), and Seven Seconds (2018).

In 2017, she played a lead role in Blame (2017). The film screened at several film festivals, and for her work Alexander won the award for Best Actress in a U.S. Narrative Film at the 2017 Tribeca Film Festival.

Personal life
Alexander identifies as pansexual. Since 2015, she has been in a relationship with her Blame co-star and director Quinn Shephard. On the final day of shooting the film Not Okay, which Shephard directed and Alexander acted in, Alexander proposed marriage to Shephard, and Shephard accepted.

Filmography

Film

Television

Web

References

External links
 

Living people
Actresses from Pittsburgh
Fiorello H. LaGuardia High School alumni
William E. Macaulay Honors College alumni
21st-century American actresses
American LGBT actors
Pansexual actresses
1994 births
LGBT people from South Carolina